Standings and results for Group 6 of the UEFA Euro 1980 qualifying tournament.

Group 6 consisted of Soviet Union, Hungary, Greece and Finland. This group proved to be one of the toughest as unexpected group winners Greece outran both Finland and Hungary by only one point and Soviet Union, who finished last, by two points.

Final table

Results

Goalscorers

References

Group 6
1978–79 in Greek football
1979–80 in Greek football
Greece at UEFA Euro 1980
1978–79 in Hungarian football
1979–80 in Hungarian football
1978 in Soviet football
1979 in Soviet football
1978 in Finnish football
1979 in Finnish football
1977–78 in Greek football